George Wakeman Wheeler (born Woodville, Mississippi, December 1,1860; died Bridgeport, Connecticut, July 27, 1932) was an American lawyer, judge, and chief justice of the Supreme Court in Connecticut.

Wheeler was educated at the Williston Seminary in Easthampton, Massachusetts and at Yale (class of 1881) and Yale Law School (class of 1883). He formed a partnership with his college roommate Howard J. Curtis which lasted until Wheeler was appointed to the Superior Court in 1893. He became a member of the Supreme Court in September 1910 and Chief Justice in August 1920, serving until his forced retirement upon turning 70 years of age in 1930.

Wheeler married Agnes Leonard Macy on August 24, 1919; two children of his children were alive at the time of his death.

References

1860 births
1932 deaths
People from Woodville, Mississippi
Connecticut lawyers
U.S. state supreme court judges admitted to the practice of law by reading law
Chief Justices of the Connecticut Supreme Court
Yale Law School alumni
Justices of the Connecticut Supreme Court